Gillet is a Belgian automobile manufacturer, started in 1992 by former racing driver Tony Gillet. The company produces the Vertigo sports coupé, an ultra-lightweight (990 kg) 'bespoke' and hand-built sportscar. The slogan of the company is "Supercar and work of art Pure Pleasure!". The first Vertigo was powered by a Ford Cosworth 2.0-litre 4-in-line, later evolutions are powered by more powerful engines: the 3.0-litre Alfa Romeo V6 engine and the 4.2-litre Ferrari/Maserati V8 in the Vertigo .5.

Company background and design of the Vertigo

Tony Gillet was a successful racing driver, winning the Belgian hill-climb championship in 1979 and 1980 and competing in two Dakar Rallies. In 1982 he became the Belgian importer for Donkervoort, a Dutch Lotus Super Seven-styled car. In January 1990 he broke the 0 to  record for production cars with a time of 3.85 seconds in a specially modified Donkervoort. The Vertigo held the 0–100 km/h record for production cars at 3.1 seconds, but this has since been broken.

The first Vertigo prototype was finished in 1991 and shown at the 71st Brussels Auto Show in January 1992. In the following two years the car was finalised for production. It was shown at the Paris and Geneva car shows in 1993. Two more cars were built: a second prototype to finalise production design and the first production car, which was used for certification, including the frontal crash-test, seat anchorage resistance and safety belts anchorage resistance tests.

The production Vertigo differed from the first prototype in materials and design. The chassis was fabricated from carbon fibre and honeycomb materials (a technology directly borrowed from Formula One), ensuring greater strength and stiffness, while saving  in chassis weight. The body was given more fluid lines with higher side windows and retractable headlights, making it closer to the first design drawings.

A Vertigo was sold to Philippe Streiff, a former Formula One racing driver who is handicapped after an accident during pre-season testing in 1989. This Vertigo was modified to be joystick-controlled and given an automatic transmission.

Gillet introduced the Vertigo .5 at Brussels in January 2008. It incorporates features from the Vertigo race car used in the 2007 FIA GT race series.

Famous Vertigo-owners are Prince Albert of Monaco and the French singer and actor Johnny Hallyday.

In 2015, Zagato released a car based on the chassis of the Vertigo .5 at the Concorso d'Eleganza Villa d'Este: the Zagato Maserati Mostro. In 2017, Albert II, Prince of Monaco visited the factory in order to show his support for Gillet. During the same year, Gillet had the opportunity to collaborate with the company Transnubel by producing 3,750,000 cubes in composite intended to the Belgian nuclear industry. 

In 2019, Gillet constructed a rolling chassis of Zagato Maserati Mostro, which is the first in a series of five.

Racing

Gillet is also active in motorsport with the racing version of the Gillet, named The Gillet Vertigo Streiff. Since 1998, the car has competed in the Belcar (Belgian GT Championship) and FIA GT Championship in the G2 Class for non-homologated cars.

A GT3 version, with a national homologation, raced briefly in the 2007 Belcar season.

In the 2008 FIA GT season Renaud Kuppens raced using a Gillet Vertigo.5 with a Maserati 4,2l V8 engine tuned to Group N specification. Renaud Kuppens said that the Maserati engine develops the same amount of power as the V6 engine, but has more torque.

The car came 26th in both the 2002 and 2003 Spa 24 Hours, and 13th in 2004. It was entered into the 24 Hours of Spa race in 2005, 2006, 2007 and 2008, but failed to finish on all occasions.

In 2018, construction of a racing Vertigo with linen bodywork and participation to the famous Pike’s Peak race in Colorado with Vanina Ickx at the wheel.

References

External links

Lotus Seven replicas
Belgian brands
Car manufacturers of Belgium